Belgharia railway station or Belghoria railway station (Bengali: বেলঘরিয়া রেলওয়ে স্টেশন) is a Kolkata Suburban Railway and one of the oldest railway station in India. It is located in Belgharia, North 24 Parganas district, West Bengal, India. This railway station situates between the Agarpara railway station and the Dum Dum Junction railway station.

History
The main line from Sealdah to Ranaghat by Eastern  Bengal Railway was opened to railway traffic in the year 1862 and extended to Kushtia in present-day Bangladesh within two months. The Sealdah–Kusthia line of the Eastern Bengal Railway used to work only on the eastern side of the Hooghly River.

Railway 
This railway station and its track is located on the Sealdah Ranaghat railway line that stretches between Kolkata district, North 24 Parganas district and Nadia district. This railway currently has 4 tracks from Sealdah to Naihati Junction and 2 tracks from Naihati Junction to Ranaghat Junction.

The track of this station is classified as C-class track, is not a speed classification. But it is used for suburban rail services in metropolitan areas.

Station complex
The infrastructure of the station is terrestrial. The railway platform is almost fully sheltered. At the station, the building for station management and the station master's building are located adjacent to the platform no. 1.  The station has two ticket counters one is outside the platform no. 4 and another is on platform no. 1.  Passengers are issued tickets from those platforms by station ticket officers for train travel.

The Down Train leaves from platform no. 2 and 3. On the other hand, the Up Train leaves from platform no. 1 and 3. There are many approach roads to this station. The Madhusudan Banarjee Road from Birati side connects the Feeder Road from Barrackpore Trunk Road side and Jessore Road through the railway station Belgharia.

There are auto rickshaw stands, E-rickshaw stands outside Platform 1 and Platform 4. All the platforms are connected with subway and foot-over bridge. The station has seating, toilet, drinking water facilities for passenger convenience. There is no four wheels vehicles parking facility at the station. But available only for bicycles and motorcycles..

Electrification
Most local passenger trains are electric trains and run on the tracks of Agarpara railway station. Electrification of this railway through the Sealdah–Ranaghat line was completed in 1963–1965.

Rail Service 
This station provides rail services to its surrounding area of the station. Trains approach for Ranaghat, Kalyani Simanta, Gede, Sealdah and Majerhat run through this station. Local trains of Kolkata Suburban Railway serve rail passengers daily at this station.

Securities 
Belgharia railway station belongs to Sealdah Railway Division of Eastern Railway Zone of Indian Railways. All the responsibilities of station management are given on the head of the station "Station Master". Apart from this, temporary mobile GRP personnel are employed for the security of the station and its premises. The security of station adjoining areas is provided by the local police administration.

See also 
 Agarpara railway station
 Dum Dum Junction railway station
 Sealdah railway station
 Howrah railway station, the oldest and the busiest railway station of India.

References

External links

 

Sealdah railway division
Railway stations in North 24 Parganas district
Transport in Kolkata
Kolkata Suburban Railway stations